Yes Man is a memoir written by Danny Wallace based upon a year of the author's life, in which he chose to say "Yes" to any offers that came his way.  It was also loosely adapted into the 2008 film Yes Man starring Jim Carrey.

Plot summary

Danny Wallace, a freelance radio producer for the BBC in London, takes three simple words uttered by a stranger on a bus—"Say yes more"—as a challenge and says "yes" to everything for a year. He says "yes" to pamphleteers on the street, the credit card offers stuffing his mailbox and solicitations on the Internet. He attends meetings with a group that believes aliens built the pyramids in Egypt, says "yes" to every invitation to go out on the town and furthers his career by saying "yes" in meetings with executives.

References

2005 non-fiction books
British memoirs
British comedy novels
Books by Danny Wallace (humorist)
Memoirs adapted into films
Simon & Schuster books